Hakan Çalhanoğlu (born 8 February 1994) is a Turkish professional footballer who plays as an attacking midfielder for  club Inter Milan and the Turkey national team, which he captains. He is well renowned as a free kick specialist, known for being effective from a multitude of angles and distances.

He began his career at German second division club Karlsruher SC in 2010 and moved to top-flight side Hamburg two years later, spending another season back at his first club on loan. His performance in his first Bundesliga season earned him a €14.5 million transfer to Bayer Leverkusen in 2014. He played for three seasons there, totalling 28 goals in 115 official appearances. In 2017, he signed for Milan for an initial €20 million fee. In the summer of 2021, he joined city rivals Inter Milan on a free transfer.

Born in Germany, Çalhanoğlu opted to represent Turkey at international level, from under-16 level onwards. He made his senior debut in 2013 and was part of their squad at UEFA Euro 2016 and Euro 2020.

Club career

Karlsruher SC
Born in Mannheim, Baden-Württemberg, Çalhanoğlu began his career with Karlsruher SC in the 2. Bundesliga in February 2012 after he was promoted from the under-19 team, although they were relegated to the 3. Liga at the end of his first season. He signed a four-year deal to join Hamburger SV in the 2012 summer transfer window, being loaned back to Karlsruhe for another season. In that season on loan, he helped the team win the third division and return to the second tier.

Hamburger SV
Çalhanoğlu made his Hamburg and Bundesliga debut on 11 August 2013, as the team opened the season with a 3–3 away draw at Schalke 04. He started the match, and was replaced by Dennis Aogo after 74 minutes. He scored his first goals for the club on 31 August, in a 4–0 home win over Eintracht Braunschweig; after replacing goalscorer Rafael van der Vaart in the 79th minute, he scored a minute later and then netted again with a free kick.

On 5 February 2014, Çalhanoğlu signed a two-year extension to his Hamburg contract, to keep him at the club until 2018. On 20 February, he scored a 41-yard free kick, against Borussia Dortmund in a 3–0 win, which ended Hamburg's bad run. As he saw no defensive wall or teammates to pass, he struck a shot that swerved viciously to find the back of the net. A delighted Çalhanoğlu said afterwards: 'I hit the free-kick the same way I do in training all the time. I'm delighted that I pulled it off!'. He was sent off for the first time in his career on 22 March, for his second booking in the 53rd minute of a 1–0 defeat away to VfB Stuttgart.

In his only full season at Hamburg, the team finished in 16th, and won a play-off against Greuther Fürth on away goals to maintain their honour as the only team to feature in every season of the top flight.

Bayer Leverkusen

Hamburg were initially unwilling to sell Çalhanoğlu to other German teams, but their purchase of Pierre-Michel Lasogga from Hertha Berlin made such an exception no longer financially viable. On 4 July 2014, he left Hamburg for league rivals Bayer Leverkusen, signing a five-year contract for a transfer fee of €14.5 million. His actions leading up to the transfer caused some controversy, including taking sick leave from Hamburg; he justified the leave by saying that he was stressed by aggression from fans, including vandalism of his car. He also criticised Hamburg's director Oliver Kreuzer, accusing him of betrayal. The move was later criticised by Son Heung-min, as a response to Çalhanoğlu calling his former Leverkusen teammate's transfer to Tottenham Hotspur "badly advised".

He made his debut for the club on 19 June, starting in a 3–2 away win at Copenhagen in the first leg of a UEFA Champions League qualification play-off. Four days later, he played his first league game for his new club, a 2–0 win away to Borussia Dortmund on the opening day of the new season. On 27 August he scored his first Leverkusen goal, netting his team's second in a 4–0 win in the second leg of their European play-off. He scored his first league goal for the club on 12 September, Leverkusen's second in a 3–3 home draw against Werder Bremen. It was the first game in any competition that season which they did not win. Çalhanoğlu was nominated for the 2014 Golden Boy Award in October.

On 25 February 2015, he scored the only goal as Leverkusen defeated Atlético Madrid in the last 16 first leg in the Champions League. However, three weeks later in the second leg, he took their first attempt in a penalty shoot-out and had it saved by Jan Oblak, as Atlético went on to win. On 2 May, Çalhanoğlu opened a 2–0 home win over newly crowned league champions Bayern Munich, with a free kick.

He opened his second season at the club by scoring a penalty on 8 August in a 3–0 win at fourth-tier Sportfreunde Lotte in the first round of the DFB-Pokal. Two weeks later, with a free kick, he scored the only goal of a league win at Hannover 96. On 26 August, he opened a 3–0 win over Lazio as Bayer came back from a first-leg deficit to qualify for the group stage of the Champions League. In their first game of the group stage, Çalhanoğlu scored twice — including a penalty earned by a handball of his free kick — in a 4–1 home rout of BATE Borisov.

He opened his 2016–17 goalscoring account on 14 September in the 2–2 home draw against CSKA Moscow in a Champions League group stage game — the 50th goal in his senior club career.

On 2 February 2017, Çalhanoğlu received a four-month ban from FIFA for a breach of contract relating to his time at Karlsruher FC. He received €100,000 from Turkish club Trabzonspor in 2011 after agreeing to sign with the club but later extended his contract with Karslruher. Trabzonspor had initially sought repayment of the €100,000 paid as well compensation of €1 million but FIFA ruled that €100,000 and a four-month ban would suffice.

AC Milan
On 3 July 2017, Çalhanoğlu signed a four-year contract with Serie A club A.C. Milan. The fee was reported as an initial €20 million, rising to €24 million. He was assigned the club's prestigious number 10 jersey, previously owned by the likes of Gianni Rivera, Ruud Gullit, Dejan Savićević, Zvonimir Boban, Rui Costa and Clarence Seedorf.

He made his Rossoneri competitive debut a month later in the second leg of the Europa League third qualifying round, replacing Suso for the final 25 minutes of a 2–0 win (3–0 aggregate) over Universitatea Craiova at the San Siro. He scored his first goal for Milan in a 5–1 away win against Austria Wien in the group stage on 14 September, also providing two assists. Domestically, Çalhanoğlu made his league debut on 20 August, playing the full 90 minutes of a 3–0 win at Crotone. He was sent off in a 2–0 home loss to Roma on 1 October, earning a second yellow card for a foul on Radja Nainggolan. Çalhanoğlu scored his first league goal on 25 October in a 4–1 win at Chievo, becoming the first Turk to net in Serie A since Emre Belözoğlu in 2003.

Inter Milan
On 22 June 2021, Çalhanoğlu signed a three-year contract with Serie A club Inter Milan, the city-rival of his previous club, on a free transfer.

Çalhanoğlu scored and assisted a goal on his Inter Milan debut, a 4–0 win over Genoa on the opening day of the 2021–22 Serie A season. He went on to score seven goals and notch twelve assists in the league, and scored in the Coppa Italia final victory against Juventus, but it was his former team Milan that went on to lift the league title. On 4 October 2022, he scored his first Champions League goal with Inter in a 1–0 win over Barcelona.

On 14 March 2023, he was named Player of the Match in the Champions League round of 16 second leg away match against Porto, which ended in a goalless draw and qualification to the quarter-final for the first time in twelve years for Inter Milan, by winning 1–0 on aggregate.

International career

Born in Germany, Çalhanoğlu opted to play for Turkey, qualifying for them through his family's origins in Trabzon. He played for the country at youth international level, including the 2013 FIFA U-20 World Cup on home soil. Turkey reached the last 16 before elimination by France. In their second group game on 28 June, Çalhanoğlu scored Turkey's equaliser in a 2–1 win over Australia at the Hüseyin Avni Aker Stadium in his ancestral city.

He made his senior international debut on 6 September 2013 in a World Cup qualifier in Kayseri, replacing Gökhan Töre for the last eight minutes of a 5–0 win against Andorra in Fatih Terim's first match back in charge. He made his first start on 25 May 2014 in a 2–1 friendly win against the Republic of Ireland at Dublin's Aviva Stadium, making way for Olcan Adın after 61 minutes.

Çalhanoğlu was sharing a hotel room with national team defender Ömer Toprak in October 2013 after a World Cup qualifying defeat to the Netherlands, when Gökhan Töre and an unknown armed friend entered the room, and threatened both roommates at gunpoint, ostensibly due to Töre's ex-girlfriend dating a friend of Toprak. The incident was hidden from Turkish media, but Çalhanoğlu revealed it to Germany's ZDF television channel. Töre did not return to the national team until October 2014, when both Çalhanoğlu and Toprak were injured. The following month, with both players back to fitness and form, both were left out by Terim for a friendly against Brazil and a UEFA Euro 2016 qualifying match against Kazakhstan while Töre remained. Çalhanoğlu questioned his omission from the team, while Terim defended his own decision and said that Töre deserved to be forgiven. In June 2015, Çalhanoğlu and Töre reconciled.

On 31 March 2015, Çalhanoğlu scored his first international goal in a 2–1 friendly win away to Luxembourg, a 30-yard strike with three minutes remaining. He scored two more in a 4–0 home friendly win over Bulgaria on 8 June, the latter being a free kick. His first competitive goal came on 10 October, a cross which secured a 2–0 away win over the Czech Republic in the UEFA Euro 2016 qualifying event.

Çalhanoğlu became the first Turk to score against England, in the 11th match between the two nations, a friendly at the City of Manchester Stadium on 22 May 2016. He equalised in the 2–1 defeat.
On 22 March 2019, Çalhanoğlu scored the second goal of Turkey's 2–0 victory over Albania in their opening UEFA Euro 2020 qualifier.

Style of play
Çalhanoğlu has been likened to Mesut Özil, another German-born midfielder of Turkish ancestry. He expressed a desire to be the equivalent of Özil in the Turkish national team.

A set-piece specialist, he is known for scoring from free kicks, and models his set-piece technique on the knuckleball free kicks of Cristiano Ronaldo and especially Juninho Pernambucano. In addition to his ability to score with power and accuracy from direct free kicks with his right foot, he is also known for his ability to bend the ball, and his set-piece delivery. In December 2013, Talksport called him "a playmaker destined for the top", praising his dedication and passing ability. Former England international Owen Hargreaves said on BT Sport in August 2015 that Çalhanoğlu's style of play would fit Liverpool or Tottenham Hotspur.

Despite mostly positive reception in his late teens and early twenties, in recent years, however, he has drawn some criticism as well; his pace was deemed insufficient for a winger, a position he adopted due to absence of his natural classic "number 10" attacking midfield role in the preferred formations of his teams, particularly A.C. Milan. He has also been criticized in the media for his lack of physical attributes and overall inconsistency of his performances. However, his dribbling, technique, passing (both short and long), crossing, and vision, as well as his eye for goal and striking ability from distance, have been referred to as his strengths. Çalhanoğlu has also been used in deeper midfield positions throughout his career, including in a holding role, in which he usually operates as a deep-lying playmaker, as an offensive–minded central midfielder, known as the mezzala role in Italian football jargon, or even in more offensive roles on occasion, as a second striker, for example.

Personal life
Çalhanoğlu was born in Mannheim, Germany, to Turkish parents originally from Bayburt, Turkey. Çalhanoğlu married his childhood sweetheart Sinem Gündoğdu, in Mannheim, in 2017. The couple had alleged marital problems, because of which Çalhanoğlu decided to file for divorce, but in 2018, the couple reportedly made up. The couple welcomed their daughter, Liya, born in Mannheim, in March 2019.

Muhammed, younger brother of Hakan, is also a professional footballer. The younger Çalhanoğlu was also formed at Waldhof Mannheim and Karlsruher SC, and went on to play in the lower divisions of Austrian and Turkish football. Similarly, his cousin Kerim Çalhanoğlu is also a footballer, and also played for Waldhof Mannheim.

In January 2017, Çalhanoğlu posted a video to Twitter supporting Turkish president Recep Tayyip Erdoğan ahead of the 2017 Turkish constitutional referendum. Bayer Leverkusen spokesman Dirk Mesch confirmed the club discussed the tweet with Çalhanoğlu.

On 11 October 2019, following Cenk Tosun's goal in a 1–0 home win over Albania in a Euro 2020 qualifier, Çalhanoğlu was one of the Turkish players who participated in a "military salute" goal celebration. That same day, he stated his open support for the Turkish offensive into north-eastern Syria with a post on Twitter, which drew criticism from numerous Italian football fans on social media.

Career statistics

Club

International

As of match played 19 November 2022. Turkey score listed first, score column indicates score after each Çalhanoğlu goal.

Honours
Karlsruher SC
3. Liga: 2012–13

Inter Milan
 Coppa Italia: 2021–22
 Supercoppa Italiana: 2021, 2022

Individual
3. Liga Player of the Season: 2012–13
Serie A Player of the Month: December 2020

References

External links

Profile at the Inter Milan website

Hakan Çalhanoğlu – UEFA competition record
Hakan Çalhanoğlu at ESPN FC

Hakan Çalhanoğlu at Topforward

1994 births
Living people
German people of Turkish descent
Footballers from Mannheim
Citizens of Turkey through descent
Turkish footballers
German footballers
Association football midfielders
Turkey international footballers
Turkey under-21 international footballers
Turkey youth international footballers
UEFA Euro 2020 players
Karlsruher SC players
Hamburger SV players
Bayer 04 Leverkusen players
A.C. Milan players
Inter Milan players
Serie A players
Bundesliga players
2. Bundesliga players
3. Liga players
UEFA Euro 2016 players
German expatriate footballers
Turkish expatriate footballers
Turkish expatriate sportspeople in Germany
Turkish expatriate sportspeople in Italy
German expatriate sportspeople in Italy
Expatriate footballers in Italy